"Tres Semanas" is the first single of the album Gracias Por Estar Aquí. Its English translation is "three weeks". The song was written and performed by Mexican singer-songwriter Marco Antonio Solís. The song was nominated for a Lo Nuestro Award for Pop Song of the Year at the 27th Lo Nuestro Awards.

Charts

Weekly charts

Year-end charts

References

Monitor Latino Top General number-one singles
2013 singles
Songs written by Marco Antonio Solís
Marco Antonio Solís songs
Universal Music Latino singles
2013 songs